Reina de Corazones is a Venezuelan telenovela written by Humberto 'Kiko' Olivieri and produced by Radio Caracas Televisión in 1998. This telenovela lasted 123 episodes and was distributed internationally by RCTV International.

Emma Rabbe and Roberto Mateos starred as the main protagonists with Dad Dager, Roberto Moll, Daniel Lugo and Kiara as antagonists.

Synopsis
Reina de Corazones is a love story marked by falsehood, rivalry and excessive ambition. Marlene Paez is a beautiful blond surrounded by a kindly aura paradoxical to her firm and determined character. She transcends many levels of pain and misery to reach international success as a model. But fame is not enough, and her empty heart is divided both by her love for Santiago Porras and her search for the truth about her past. Soon, events conspire to draw her back to Topochal, the town of her birth, at the height of her career.

Santiago Porras is a man of great ideals and passions, who, for the love of Marlene, decides to take the road to priesthood after finding out that his father "El Diablo" is the presumed murderer of her parents. Destiny reunites Marlene and Santiago at the funeral of Marlene's stepmother Dolores. As the beautiful Marlene sheds her first tear, the sky explodes with rain, ending a lengthy and severe drought. Sensing that a miracle has occurred, the amazed and beholden townspeople claim Marlene as queen of their hearts.

Time has changed nothing; the passions of these reunited lovers still smolder. But a strong rivalry between two factions in the town, created and led by Ramiro Vegas and Odilo Santos, begins to intrude on their love. And in their battle for power, the two leaders ignore another true love story, that which bonds their adolescent children Julieta and Federico. Once again, political passions and a darkened past between families threaten to obstruct the purity of love.

Though tortured by their past, Marlene and Santiago share a goal: to dissolve the factions and reunite their beloved Topochal. In his crusade for harmony, Santiago recovers property documents that have been lost and returns the land to the original owners. Righting this wrong enables him to shed the cassock's enormous weight. Now a layman, Santiago goes to Marlene with an open heart, but she rejects him because of his earlier abandonment and with holding of the truth about his past.

The dark history of Topochal could happen again unless Marlene and Santiago succeed in their quest to uncover hidden truths and replace rivalry with love. They will have to overcome their disillusionment to achieve what they both really want: unity for themselves and their town.

Cast

Emma Rabbe as Marlene Paez/Sara
Roberto Mateos as Santiago Porras
Ricardo Álamo as Jean Paul
Alberto Alifa as Father Barrientos
César Bencid as Berensejo
Marcos Campos as Matute
Dad Dager as Catalina Monsalve
Dessideria D'Caro as Maria Gracia
Albi De Abreu as Federico
Paola Eagles as Dulce
Freddy Galavis as Juvenal
Javier Gomez as Germán Andueza
Luke Grande as Bartolo
Francisco Guinot as Padre Servillo
Carlos Guillermo Haydon as Adriano Vicentelli
Tomas Henriquez as Fulgencio Cruz
Kiara as Luisa Elena
Maria Luisa Lamata as Socorro
Jeannette Lehr as Elsa
Daniel Lugo as Ramiro Vega
Prakriti Maduro as Dayana
Roberto Moll as Odilo Santos
Denise Novell as Isabela Cotala
Amalia Perez Diaz as Solvencia
Jennifer Rodriguez as Julieta Carolina
Jose Romero as Gandica
Tania Sarabia as Zoila Guerra
Carolina Tejera as Mesalina
Beatriz Valdes as Salomé de Santos

References

External links
Reina de Corazones at the Internet Movie Database
Opening credits

1998 telenovelas
1998 Venezuelan television series debuts
1998 Venezuelan television series endings
RCTV telenovelas
Venezuelan telenovelas
Spanish-language telenovelas
Television shows set in Caracas